The gorals are four species in the genus Naemorhedus. They are small ungulates with a goat-like or antelope-like appearance. Until recently, this genus also contained the serow species (now in genus Capricornis).

Etymology
The original name is based on Latin nemor-haedus, from nemus, nemoris 'grove' and haedus 'little goat', but it was misspelt Naemorhedus by Hamilton Smith (1827).

The name "goral" comes from an eastern Indian word for the Himalayan goral.

Extant species

Habitat
Gorals are often found on rocky hillsides at high elevations. Though their territories often coincide with those of the closely related serow, the goral will usually be found on higher, steeper slopes with less vegetation.

Characteristics
Coloration differs between species and individuals, but generally ranges from light gray to dark red-brown, with lighter patches on the chest, throat, and underside, and a dark stripe down the spine. They have woolly undercoats covered by longer, coarser hair, which helps to protect them in the cold areas where they are often found.

Though the groups share many similarities, gorals are stockier than antelopes and have broader, heavier hooves. Female gorals have four functional teats, while female goats and sheep have only two functional teats. Unlike serows, gorals have no working preorbital glands.

References

Caprids